Upper Philipstown is a barony in County Offaly (formerly King's County), Republic of Ireland.

Etymology
The name Upper Philipstown is derived from Philipstown, the former name of Daingean.

Location

Upper Philipstown is located in northeast County Offaly, north of the River Barrow.

History
As Viscount Clanmalier the Ó Diomasaigh (O'Dempsey) held part of Upper Philipstown, which was roughly formed from the tuath, Ferann Clainne Diarmata. The original Philipstown barony was split into lower and upper by 1807.

List of settlements

Below is a list of settlements in Upper Philipstown:
Clonygowan
Portarlington (northern part)
 Walsh Island

References

Baronies of County Offaly